Robert Arnott Wilson (born 1958) is a retired mathematician in London, England, who is best known for his work on classifying the maximal subgroups of finite simple groups and for the work in the Monster group. He is also an accomplished violin, viola and piano player, having played as the principal viola in the Sinfonia of Birmingham. Due to a damaged finger, he now principally plays the kora.

Books
 
An Atlas of Brauer Characters (London Mathematical Society Monographs) by Christopher Jansen, Klaus Lux, Richard Parker, Robert Wilson. Oxford University Press, USA (October 1, 1995)

as editor

Selected articles
 
 with Peter B. Kleidman: 
 with R. A. Parker: 
 with M. D. E. Conder and A. J. Woldar: 
 
 
 
 
 
 with Petra E. Holmes:

References

External links
Wilson's online Atlas of finite group representations
Homepage
Mathematics Genealogy Project entry on Wilson

1958 births
Living people
20th-century English mathematicians
21st-century English  mathematicians
Group theorists
Alumni of Trinity College, Cambridge
English classical violists